Geologica Carpathica is a peer-reviewed open access scholarly journal publishing original research on the geology of the Carpathian-Balkanian and adjacent regions. It is an official journal of the Carpathian-Balkan Geological Association, and is co-published with the support of the Earth Science Institute of the Slovak Academy of Sciences, the Polish Geological Institute, and the Institute of Geology of the Czech Academy of Sciences.

Abstracting and indexing 
The journal is abstracted and indexed in:

References

External links 
 

Open access journals
Publications established in 1950
English-language journals
Geology journals